Mahina Maeda (前田マヒナ, Maeda Mahina, born 15 February 1998) is a Hawaii born and raised, Japanese professional surfer who competes in the World Surf League. She is a three time junior World champion. She switched to represent Japan at the Olympics as Hawaii was not recognized as a member of International Olympic Committee.

Biography 
She was born to Japanese parents in the United States and was raised up in North Shore of Oahu. She holds American-Japanese dual citizenship.

Career 
She won her first WSL world junior title at the age of 16 in Portugal. She became one of the youngest women to have surfed Nazare. She qualified to the 2020 Summer Olympics following her performance at the 2021 ISA World Surfing Games. Incidentally, surfing was included for the first time in Olympics for the Tokyo Games.

She represented Japan at the 2020 Summer Olympics which also marked her debut appearance at the Olympics. She was eliminated from the round 3 of the women's shortboard event.

References 

1998 births
Living people
American surfers
Japanese surfers
World Surf League surfers
Surfers at the 2020 Summer Olympics
Olympic surfers of Japan
American people of Japanese descent
People from Oahu
Female surfers
American sportspeople of Japanese descent